Port Byron is the name of several places in the United States:

 Port Byron, Illinois
 Port Byron Township, Illinois
 Port Byron, New York